The following is a timeline of the history of the city of Clermont-Ferrand, France.

Early history

1st C. BCE – Augustonemetum founded at near Nemossos, the ancient capital of the Arverni
2nd C. CE – Augustonemetum has grown into a city, with a population estimated at between 15,000 and 30,000
3rd C. CE
 the city is depopulated, and survives only as a fort at the site of the forum.
 St Austremonius, the apostle of Auvergne and first bishop of Clermont.
 4th C. CE – the settlement is now known as Arvernis, with a population estimated at 700 people; the Roman Catholic diocese of Clermont is established. Five gates are built into the fortifications, while the rest of the Roman city lies in ruins.
 5th C. –  construction begins.
 471/475 –  Arvernis besieged by the Visigoths; part of the Visigothic kingdom until the Frankish conquest in 507.
 535 – Council of Clermont (535).
 549 – Second council of Clermont.
 587 – Third council of Clermont.

Medieval to early modern
761 – Pepin the Short pillages urbs Arverna and takes its fort, Claremontem Castrum in the Siege of Clermont (761). 
848 – first mention of the name Clermont (Clarus Mons) as the name of the city; Arvernis remains in use as alongside Clermont at least until the end of the 9th century.
862 – city destroyed by Vikings and rebuilt under bishop Sigon
898/910 – city again pillaged by Vikings
946 – traditional date for the consecration of the Romanesque cathedral built under bishop Stephen II.
 1095 –  Council of Clermont: pope gives speech that starts the First Crusade.
 12th C. – Basilica of Notre-Dame du Port rebuilt (approximate date).
 1130 – Religious  held in Clermont.
 13th C. – Construction of gothic-style Clermont Cathedral begins.
 1273 –  construction begins.
 15th C. –  construction begins.
 1515 –  (fountain) erected by Jacques d'Amboise.
 1623 – 19 June: Birth of Blaise Pascal.
 1665 –  begin.
 1675 –  building construction begins.
 1747 –  founded.
 1790 – Clermont-Ferrand becomes part of the Puy-de-Dôme souveraineté.

19th century
 1801
 Cantons of Clermont-Est, Clermont-Nord, Clermont-Sud, and Clermont-Sud-Ouest created.
  erected.
 1806 – Population: 30,982.
 1826 – Chamber of Commerce established.
 1855
 Clermont-Ferrand station opens.
 Moniteur du Puy-de-Dôme newspaper begins publication.
 1858 –  installed in the Place de la Rodade.
 1862 –  and  built.
 1886 – Population: 46,718.
 1889 – Michelin et Cie in business.
 1890 - Clermont-Ferrand tramway initiated.
 1894 – Société d'histoire naturelle d'Auvergne established.
 1896 – Avenir du Puy-de-Dôme newspaper begins publication.

20th century

 1906 –  (shop) built.
 1911 – Population: 65,386.
 1919 – La Montagne newspaper begins publication.
 1921 – Population: 82,577.
 1926 – Population: 111,711.
 1940
 June: City briefly occupied by German forces.
 July: City becomes temporary seat of government of France, which shortly relocates to Vichy.
 1944 –  begins publication.
 1961
  built.
 Association Montferrand Renaissance founded.
 1974 – Jardin botanique de la Charme (garden) created.
 1975 – Population: 156,763.
 1977 – Islamic community of Clermont-Ferrand established in the former Refuge du Bon Pasteur chapel.
 1979 –  in use.
 1982
 Clermont-Ferrand International Short Film Festival begins.
 1995 –  begins broadcasting.
 1999
  convention centre opens.
 Population: 137,140.

21st century

 2003 – Le Magazine Zap begins publication.(fr)
 2006
 Place de Jaude inaurated.
 Clermont-Ferrand tramway begins operating.
 2010 –  built.
 2012 – Population: 141,569.
 2014 – Olivier Bianchi becomes mayor.
 2015
 Cantons of Clermont-Ferrand-1, 2, 3, 4, 5 and 6 created per .
 March:  held.
 December:  held.
 2016 – Clermont-Ferrand becomes part of the Auvergne-Rhône-Alpes region.

See also
 Clermont-Ferrand history
 
 Augustonemetum (Roman-era settlement)
 List of mayors of Clermont-Ferrand
 

other cities in the Auvergne-Rhône-Alpes region
 Timeline of Grenoble
 Timeline of Lyon
 Timeline of St Etienne

References

This article incorporates information from the French Wikipedia.

Bibliography

in English
 
 
 
 
 
 
 
  (case study of Clermont-Ferrand)

in French
 
 
  1840–1847. 8 vols.

External links

 Items related to Clermont-Ferrand, various dates (via Europeana).
 Items related to Clermont-Ferrand, various dates (via Digital Public Library of America).

clermont
Clermont-Ferrand
clermont